Penwartha Coombe is a hamlet south of Perranporth, Cornwall, England.

References

Hamlets in Cornwall